Robert Baird "Bob" McClure  OOnt FRCS (Edin.) FICS (November 23, 1900 – November 10, 1991) was a Canadian physician, medical missionary to China, Taiwan, Gaza, India, and Borneo, and the 23rd Moderator of the United Church of Canada, the first unordained lay person to hold that position.

Early life
Robert McClure's father, Dr. William McClure, was born in Lachute, Quebec, and earned a medical degree under William Osler at McGill University. William's wife, Margaret (nee Baird) McClure, was born in Pennsylvania. Together, the two became missionaries at a Presbyterian mission in Wuhan, China in 1888. The Boxer Rebellion of 1900 forced the McClures and their two young daughters to evacuate to the port of Shanghai, although Margaret was three months pregnant. From Shanghai, they parted ways. William joined the medical unit of the HMS Centurion under the command of  Captain John Jellicoe, which was headed for Beijing as part of the Seymour Expedition. Margaret and her daughters sailed to North America on the SS Shinano Maru, landing at Portland, Oregon, where her son Robert was born on November 23, 1900. By 1901, the Boxer Rebellion had been suppressed, and the McClures were reunited in Weihui, where the Presbyterian Church had established a new mission.

Robert McClure grew up in the Weihui compound, and due to his friendships with Chinese playmates, could speak both English and Mandarin by an early age. In 1910, William took a two-year sabbatical and returned with his family to North America, staying with Margaret's relatives in Wooster, Ohio. In 1912, when William was scheduled to return to Weihui, the family made the decision that William and 11-year-old Robert would return to China, while Margaret would stay in North America with her daughters as they completed their primary and high school studies.  

After three more years in China, William returned with Robert to North America for another sabbatical, and the family reunited in Toronto, where Robert's two sisters were enrolled at school, Janet at the University of Toronto, and Margaret at Harbord Collegiate Institute. Robert was also enrolled at Harbord, and during his first summer in Toronto, he worked at the Russell Motor Car Company, making munitions for the Canadian Expeditionary Force fighting in the First World War. The next summer, he worked on a farm as part of the "Soldiers of the Soil" program.

University
In the fall of 1917, Robert enrolled in medicine at the University of Toronto, working evenings and weekends as a stevedore at the Toronto docks or a baggage handler at Union Station to earn enough to pay his tuition. He also attended Bloor Street Church, where he was greatly influenced by the sermons of Dr. George C. Pigeon, who would go on to become the first Moderator of the United Church of Canada in 1925.

In 1920, Robert met Amy Hislop and the two started to date. In 1922, McClure graduated with his medical degree, and was planning to do post-graduate surgical work at Harvard University before joining the British Colonial Service. He was approached by George Pidgeon, who asked McClure if he would instead consider travelling to Qinyang, China to replace the doctor at the Presbyterian mission hospital who had been killed by bandits. When McClure pointed out that he needed a year of surgical training, Pidgeon arranged for McClure to work with Dr. Kenneth Perfect at Western Hospital in Toronto for a year.

China missionary   
McClure arrived in China in early 1924. Since he could speak Mandarin but could neither read nor write Chinese characters, he enrolled in Chinese language school for several months.  McClure then travelled to Qinyang to take up his post as mission doctor at the Menzies Memorial Hospital. The following year, with the formation of  the United Church of Canada from the union of the Presbyterian, Methodist and Congregationalist Churches, the hospital and mission became a United Church charge. 

In 1926, Robert asked a colleague travelling to Toronto to present Amy Hislop with his marriage proposal; Amy said yes, and the two met later that year in Tianjin to be married. Robert returned to Qinyang with his new bride, but less than a year later full civil war broke out between the Kuomintang, Communists and Nationalists, forcing Robert and his pregnant wife to flee to Tianjin. McClure relocated to a Presbyterian mission hospital in Taipei on the island of Taiwan, which was occupied by Japan at the time. There he worked with Dr. George Gushue-Taylor, a highly respected  English surgeon who in 1917 had co-authored a Taiwanese-language nursing manual, Lāi-goā-kho Khàn-hō͘-ha̍k. In addition to his medical work, McClure started to learn the Amoy dialect so he could speak directly with his patients, and he also learned some rudimentary Japanese for his dealings with local authorities. Two children were born to the McClures during their time in Taiwan.

Prodded by Gushue-Taylor, McClure made the decision to earn his FRCS degree, and in 1930, travelled to the UK to commence his studies. After surgical training and study at Chelsea Hospital, McClure failed the FRCS exam. He rejoined his family in Canada and studied surgery at Toronto General Hospital then re-took the FRCS exam in Toronto in the spring of 1931 but for a second time, he failed. He immediately travelled to Edinburgh to sit for the summer exam, and this time, he passed.     

During his studies in Edinburgh, McClure had learned about the use of radium in cancer treatments. At the time, radium was very expensive, costing £15,000 per gram. In preparation for a return to the mission hospital at Qinyang, McClure raised enough money to buy a few micrograms of radium. One of his donors was diplomat Vincent Massey. McClure was the second missionary doctor in the world to buy radium (the first being the Canadian doctor William James Wanless for the Miraj Medical Centre in India.)    

The family moved back to Qinyang in late 1931. In the next two years, the McClure family expanded with the arrival of two more children. In 1934, McClure travelled to Europe for five months to study the latest developments in the use of radiation treatments for cancer.

In 1937, McClure became the Field Director for the International Red Cross (IRC), and in this role, tried to convince all the factions vying for control of central China to allow for the free movement of medical supplies and treatment of wounded soldiers. During one of these attempts, he was detained by Japanese soldiers as a spy, and was only saved from immediate execution by the intervention of a Japanese officer who had worked with McClure on rural reconstruction.  

On February 23, 1938, McClure crossed paths with fellow Canadian doctor Norman Bethune, who was travelling to join Communist forces at Shanxi. McClure biographer Munro Scott characterized the meeting as unpleasant, saying, "Dr. McClure had found Dr. Bethune to be very anti-Canadian, paranoic about his thoracic work, too militantly communist, and bitter." It was the only meeting of the two Canadian doctors — 18 months later Bethune would die from blood poisoning contracted while performing combat surgery.

Later that spring, McClure had to abandon attempts to negotiate with the Japanese forces in China when he learned they had placed a bounty of US$50,000 on his head. Through his work with the IRC, he did meet Soong Mei-ling, wife of Kuomintang leader Chiang Kai-shek. McClure developed a friendship with both of them, and a few months later Soong Mei-Ling asked McClure to travel to England to speak at a World Red Cross Conference on behalf of the Kuomintang's Central China Committee.

With the situation in China deteriorating, McClure was unable to return to his work, so he reunited with his family in Toronto and filled his time doing fundraising tours of the United States and Europe for the IRC before attending a world missionary conference in Madras, India. While there, McClure was told about the Burma Road that had just been completed by the British to connect Rangoon, Burma to Kunming, China. Seeing this as a potential way to get medical supplies into China for the IRC while bypassing Chinese ports blocked by warring factions, McClure decided to test it, and became only the third person to drive a car the length of the road. McClure set out to organize regular relief convoys along the road.

In late 1939, McClure was pinned between two trucks, suffering several serious injuries, and travelled back to Canada to convalesce. While there, he made several public speeches in which he accused the Canadian government of allowing nickel to be exported through various clandestine channels to Japan, which was then using it for war munitions against China. On December 7, 1940, McClure was summoned to a meeting in Ottawa with the prime minister, William Lyon MacKenzie King. Although King admitted to McClure that Canadian nickel was making its way to Japan in greater amounts than even McClure had suspected, King ordered McClure to recant his speeches or face arrest for subversive activities under the Defence of Canada Regulations and the War Measures Act. Realizing he could not help China or the IRC from prison, McClure unhappily sat down with Under-secretary of State Norman Robertson to craft a letter of apology.

In April 1941, McClure was approached by the Quaker organization Friends' Ambulance Unit (FAU) to move medical supplies and surgical teams into China along the Burma Road while evacuating wounded. McClure immediately left for Asia, and quickly set up what became known as the "China Convoy."

By 1942, McClure's abilities, knowledge of the Chinese people and friendship with Chiang Kai-shek came to the attention of Vincent Massey, previously one of McClure's donors of funds for radium, and at the time Canada's High Commissioner in the UK. Massey sent a telegram to Norman Robertson in Ottawa suggesting McClure would be an ideal candidate as "Canadian Minister to China." But Roberston reminded Prime Minister King of the "thoroughly unsatisfactory business" they had experienced with McClure two years previous, and King noted "I wouldn't consider him." 

In addition to his organizational work, McClure also handled surgery at the hospital at Baoshan. The issue of how to rescue injured Allied pilots who had been forced to land in remote Himalayan valleys came to the attention of McClure. He had learned how to parachute in Toronto, and several times parachuted into remote locations in order to give first aid and organize transportation of injured pilots out to the Burma Road, where they could be evacuated.

During this time, McClure's friendship with Chiang Kai-shek and Soong Mei-ling came to end when Soong Mei-ling demanded that medical supplies coming up the Burma Road not be used on wounded Communist soldiers, which McClure refused to consider.

In 1945, as the Japanese withdrew from northern China, McClure organized medical relief operations for the province of Hunan. In June 1946, with the wartime FAU morphing into the peacetime Friends Service Unit, McClure opened a United Church mission hospital in Hankou and spent two years there. 

In 1948, the Communist faction under Mao Zedong swept across China, driving the Kuomintang off-shore to Taiwan. Although McClure was willing to stay in China during the Communist takeover and try to negotiate his medical services with the new regime, he was suddenly called back to Canada due to the critical illness of one of his daughters. By the time she recovered, the Communist takeover of China was complete, and McClure found himself locked out of China due to his former friendship with Chiang Kai-shek and Soong Mei-ling.

Gaza
Following his return to Canada, McClure spent 18 months as surgeon and gynaecologist in a group practice in Toronto, which he recalled as "a dull life" after his adventures in China and Burma. In 1950, the Church Missionary Society sent him to the Gaza Strip to run a mission hospital. His one-year appoinment dragged on to four years because the Church Missionary Society was unable to locate a replacement surgeon. Finally McClure jokingly suggested they sell the hospital, and to his surprise, they did agree to allow McClure to sell the hospital to another mission society.

India
Almost immediately, the United Church of Canada sent McClure to the Ratlam Christian Hospital at Ratlam, India. The hospital had only been used for minor surgery before his arrival, but now he set out to make it a centre of major surgery as well as a treatment centre for bone fractures. McClure also set up a medical lab, and started a program to train people as basic lab technicians. After four months of training, each technician was sent back to their village able to handle basic lab procedures such as blood counts and slide smears.

On September 1, 1966, the Canadian Broadcasting Company aired a television special "Dr. Bob McClure: medical missionary" about his life and his work in Ratlam. It was only the second colour program to air on CBC-TV. During the program, McClure talked about the reason he sought missionary work: "One of the great motivations in missionary work is the spirit of adventure. I would define adventure as being risk with a purpose, as distinct from simply risk of weaving at high speed through crowded traffic. That sort of risk with purpose gives you adventure and a good feeling, a thrill... and a very good feeling when it is all over." In terms of the suffering he saw around him, McClure said, "Sure there are things you meet that make you feel very deeply, but emotionalism must be expressed in long-term determination, not in fluffy sentimentality."

McClure stayed at Ratlam for 13 years. In 1967, at the age of 66, he declared that he was retiring, and returned to Canada.

Moderator
In 1967, the United Church, with a million adult members, was the largest Protestant denomination in Canada. Since its inception in 1925, the spiritual head of the church, the moderator, had always been an ordained minister. But in the late 1960s, discontent was starting to ripple through the church. Canadian author Pierre Berton, in his 1966 book The Comfortable Pew, called the hierarchy of the mainline denominations in Canada too staid, the clergy too interested in liturgy rather than engagement with issues of social justice. At the 23rd General Council of the United Church in 1968, delegates were looking for a new voice, and elected the forthright and plain-spoken Bob McClure as moderator, the first layperson to hold that office. As McClure admitted, "In appointing a layman as a Moderator in a General Council with probably 50 expert theologians present, it’s obvious the United Church didn't want theological views. They appointed a layman as Moderator presumably because they wanted a clear view of the relationship of the Canadian citizen to the needs of a very shrinking world."

During his three-year term, McClure was not afraid to espouse controversial viewse not supported by church policy, admitting in an interview three months after his election "my tongue has already gotten me in a little hot water." Some of the items McClure supported such as legalized abortion and the acceptance of American draft dodgers were not church policy, but the United Church came to support them in the years after his term ended.

Retirement
After his term as moderator ended, McClure's "retirement" became an opportunity to travel the world and use his medical skills on a voluntary basis. The 70-year-old first travelled to Southeast Asia as an OXFAM volunteer to do a family planning survey. He then accepted a medical position at a Methodist mission hospital in Malaysia. In 1975, he travelled to the Amazon Basin of Peru to inoculate river communities. In 1977, he worked as a volunteer surgeon in Kimpese, Zaire. In 1978, as his last medical work, he treated patients at a United Church clinic in Fort Simpson, British Columbia. 

In 1979, at age 78, he settled down in Toronto, but was a frequent public speaker, averaging 15 speeches a month. He also led annual tourist groups to some of his former locations in China, India, the Burma Road, and Borneo.

At age 90, he was diagnosed with inoperable pancreatic cancer, and died on November 9, 1991.

Awards and recognition
Companion of the Order of Canada, 1971. "For his services to humanity, particularly as a medical missionary."
Member of the Order of Ontario, 1990.
On December 7, 1978, with Bob and Amy McClure in the visitors' gallery, the Ontario Legislature unanimously passed a resolution, "That this House recognizes the outstanding achievements of Dr. Robert McClure whose life of service at home, in China and elsewhere in the world exemplifies the most commendable aspects of the human spirit."
Man of the Year Peace Award of the Lester B. Pearson Peace Park, 1985.
Two United Churches in Canada are named for McClure: 
McClure United Church in Saskatoon, Saskatchewan. (An intermediate care facility built next to the church in 2005 was named Amy McClure House after Bob McClure's wife.) 
Robert McClure United Church in Calgary, Alberta

References

Further reading
McClure, Robert G., Vintage McClure; (with Diane Forrest), Welch Publishing, Burlington, Ontario 1988.
Scott, Munroe, McClure: The China Years (1977) and McClure: Years of Challenge (1979)

1900 births
1991 deaths
University of Toronto alumni
American expatriates in China
Canadian nuclear medicine physicians
Companions of the Order of Canada
Members of the Order of Ontario
Moderators of the United Church of Canada
Physicians from Portland, Oregon
Protestant missionaries in Palestine (region)
Christian medical missionaries
Canadian Protestant missionaries
Members of the United Church of Canada
Protestant missionaries in China